Masjchun Sofwan (7 September 1927 – 3 October 2015) was the governor of Jambi from 1979 to 1989. After graduating from Gadjah Mada University, Sofwan served as the mayor of the Temanggung Regency from 1964 until 1978. He replaced Eddy Sabara as the governor of the province.

He died on 3 October 2015 in Jakarta due to complications from a disease.

References

1927 births
2015 deaths
Governors of Jambi
People from Blitar
Gadjah Mada University alumni
Mayors and regents of places in Central Java
Regents of places in Indonesia